Hot Water Music is a collection of short stories by Charles Bukowski, published in 1983 by Black Sparrow Press. The collection deals largely with drinking, women, gambling, and writing. It is an important collection that establishes Bukowski's minimalist style and his thematic oeuvre.

The punk rock band Hot Water Music is named after the collection.

Contents
Less Delicate than the Locust
Scream When You Burn
A Couple of Gigolos
The Great Poet
You Kissed Lily
Hot Lady
It's a Dirty World
900 Pounds
Decline and Fall
Have You Read Pirandello?
Strokes to Nowhere
Some Mother
Scum Grief
Not Quite Bernadette
Some Hangover
A Working Day
The Man Who Loved Elevators
Head Job
Turkeyneck Morning
In and Out and Over
I love you Albert
White Dog Hunch
Long Distance Drunk
How To Get Published
Spider
The Death of the Father I
The Death of the Father II
Harry Ann Landers
Beer at the Corner Bar
The Upward Bird
Cold Night
A Favor for Don
Praying Mantis
Broken Merchandise
Home Run
Fooling Marie

References

Short story collections by Charles Bukowski
1983 short story collections